Aridaeus is a genus of beetles belonging to the family Cerambycidae.

The species of this genus are found in Australia and New Zealand.

Species:

 Aridaeus heros 
 Aridaeus nigripes 
 Aridaeus princeps 
 Aridaeus sumbaensis 
 Aridaeus thoracicus 
 Aridaeus timoriensis

References 

Cerambycidae